Paraldehyde is the cyclic trimer of acetaldehyde molecules. Formally, it is a derivative of 1,3,5-trioxane, with a methyl group substituted for a hydrogen atom at each carbon. The corresponding tetramer is metaldehyde. A colourless liquid, it is sparingly soluble in water and highly soluble in ethanol. Paraldehyde slowly oxidizes in air, turning brown and producing an odour of acetic acid. It quickly reacts with most plastics and rubber.

Paraldehyde was first observed in 1835 by the German chemist Justus Liebig; its empirical formula was determined in 1838 by Liebig's student Hermann Fehling. The German chemist Valentin Hermann Weidenbusch (1821–1893), another of Liebig's students, synthesized paraldehyde in 1848 by treating acetaldehyde with acid (either sulfuric or nitric acid) and cooling to 0°C. He found it quite remarkable that when paraldehyde was heated with a trace of the same acid, the reaction went the other way, recreating acetaldehyde.

Paraldehyde has uses in industry and medicine.

Preparation 
Paraldehyde can be produced by the trimerization of three acetaldehyde molecules in the presence of sulfuric acid. The product of the reaction is dependent on the temperature. At room temperature, the formation of trimer is preferred, but at lower temperatures, around  −10 °C, the tetramer metaldehyde is more likely to be produced.

The trimerization reaction is exothermic, with the heat of reaction −113 kJ·mol−1.

Stereochemistry 
Paraldehyde is produced and used as a mixture of two diastereomers, known as cis- and trans-paraldehyde.  For each diastereomer, two chair conformers are possible. The structures (1), (4) and (2), (3) are conformers of cis- and trans-paraldehyde, respectively. The structures (3) (a conformer of (2)) and (4) (a conformer of (1)) are high energy conformers on steric grounds (1,3-diaxial interactions are present) and do not exist to any appreciable extent in a sample of paraldehyde.

Reactions
Heated with catalytic amounts of acid, it depolymerizes back to acetaldehyde:

C6H12O3 → 3CH3CHO

Since paraldehyde has better handling characteristics, it may be used indirectly or directly as a synthetic equivalent of anhydrous acetaldehyde (b.p. 20 °C). For example, it is used as-is in the synthesis of bromal (tribromoacetaldehyde):

 C6H12O3 + 9 Br2 → 3 CBr3CHO + 9 HBr

Medical applications
Paraldehyde was introduced into clinical practice in the UK by the Italian physician Vincenzo Cervello (1854–1918) in 1882.

It is a central nervous system depressant and was soon found to be an effective anticonvulsant, hypnotic and sedative. It was included in some cough medicines as an expectorant (though there is no known mechanism for this function beyond the placebo effect).

Paraldehyde was the last injection given to Edith Alice Morrell in 1950 by the suspected serial killer John Bodkin Adams. He was tried for her murder but acquitted.

As a hypnotic/sedative
It was commonly used to induce sleep in sufferers from delirium tremens but has been replaced by other drugs in this regard. It was considered to have been one of the safest hypnotics and was regularly given at bedtime in psychiatric hospitals and geriatric wards up until the 1970s , however after it was confirmed that acetaldehyde is a confirmed category 1 human carcinogen, it could no longer be considered appropriately safe to use. Up to 30% of the dose is excreted via the lungs (the rest via the liver). This contributes to a strong unpleasant odour on the breath.

As anti-seizure
It has been used in the treatment of convulsions.

Today, paraldehyde is sometimes used to treat status epilepticus. Unlike diazepam and other benzodiazepines, it does not suppress breathing at therapeutic doses and so is safer when no resuscitation facilities exist or when the patient's breathing is already compromised. This makes it a useful emergency medication for parents and other caretakers of children with epilepsy. Since the dose margin between the anticonvulsant and hypnotic effect is small, paraldehyde treatment usually results in sleep.

Administration

Generic paraldehyde is available in 5 mL sealed glass ampoules. Production in the US has been discontinued, but it was previously marketed as Paral.

Paraldehyde has been given orally, rectally, intravenously and by intramuscular injection. It reacts with rubber and plastic which limits the time it may safely be kept in contact with some syringes or tubing before administration.

 Injection. Intramuscular injection can be very painful and lead to sterile abscesses, nerve damage, and tissue necrosis. Intravenous administration can lead to pulmonary edema, circulatory collapse and other complications.
 Oral. Paraldehyde has a hot burning taste and can upset the stomach. It is often mixed with milk or fruit juice in a glass cup and stirred with a metal spoon.
 Rectal. It may be mixed 1 part paraldehyde with 9 parts saline or, alternatively, with an equal mixture of peanut or olive oil.

Industrial applications
Paraldehyde is used in resin manufacture as an alternative to formaldehyde when making phenol formaldehyde resins. It has also found use as antimicrobial preservative, and rarely as a solvent. It has been used in the generation of aldehyde fuchsin.

References

External links

 Paraldehyde Injection B.P Data Sheet
 Drugs.com: Paraldehyde
 Paraldehyde Chemical Data

Acetals
Anticonvulsants
Hypnotics
Solvents
GABAA receptor positive allosteric modulators
Trioxanes